Catahoula  may refer to:

 Catahoula Cur, an American dog breed
 Catahoula Parish, Louisiana